The 2014 Indian general election polls in Assam for 14 Lok Sabha seats was held in three phases on 7, 12 and 24 April 2014. The total voter strength of Assam is 18,723,032.

The main political parties in Assam are Indian National Congress (INC), Bharatiya Janata Party (BJP), Asom Gana Parishad, All India United Democratic Front (AIUDF) and others.

Despite threats from insurgent militant groups in Northeast India, people turned out in large numbers for voting. Voters turnout in Assam was 80% which was one of highest in India.

Opinion poll

Election schedule

Constituency wise Election schedule are given below-

Results
The results of the elections were declared on 16 May 2014.
Voter Turnout was 80% despite threats from terrorist outfits

Results by Constituency

References

Indian general elections in Assam
2010s in Assam
Assam